Janice Carroll, born as Janice Marie Slack, (9 February 1932 - 10 September 1993), was an American actress, who played in nearly sixty films, plays, and television series that include: Simon & Simon, The Blue and the Gray, Quincy M.E., The Rockford Files, Barnaby Jones, Little House on the Prairie, The Waltons, Miracle on 34th Street, Mister Ed, Daddy Long Legs, Shane, How to Succeed in Business Without Really Trying, and many others.

Filmography

References

External links
 
 Janice Carroll — BFI

1932 births
1993 deaths
American television actresses
American film actresses
Actresses from California
20th-century American actresses